Chiyeh (also Romanized as Chīyeh) is a village in Itivand-e Jonubi Rural District, Kakavand District, Delfan County, Lorestan Province, Iran. At the 2006 census, its population was 196, in 42 families.

References 

Towns and villages in Delfan County